The Brown Peaks are a series of low peaks surmounting a ridge  long, standing  east of Robinson Bluff at the east side of Amundsen Glacier. First roughly mapped from ground surveys and from air photos by the Byrd Antarctic Expedition, 1928–30, they were named by the Advisory Committee on Antarctic Names for Kenneth R. Brown, a biologist with the McMurdo Station winter party of 1964.

References 

Mountains of the Ross Dependency
Amundsen Coast